Melakorukkai is a village in the Kumbakonam taluk of Thanjavur district, Tamil Nadu, India.

Demographics 

As per the 2001 census, Melakorukkai had a total population of 2281 with 1138 males and 1143 females. The sex ratio was 1004. The literacy rate was 73.19
Melakorukkai has a total population of 2,521 people. There are about 654 houses in Melakorukkai village.

Villages in Thanjavur district

Geography 
The total geographical area of village is 299.78 hectares. Kumbakonam is nearest town to Melakorukkai.